Guy Lapébie (28 November 1916 – 8 March 2010) was a French cyclist, who won two gold and one silver medals at the 1936 Summer Olympics. After World War II he became a professional road racer.

Lapébie's elder brother was Tour de France winner Roger Lapébie. Guy's son Serge (1948–1991) was also a professional cyclist.

Major results

1936
 Olympic Champion 4000m team pursuit
 Olympic Champion Team road race
 second place Olympic individual road race
1945
Zürich-Lausanne
1946
GP du Locle
Tour des 3 Lacs
1948
Six days of Paris (with Arthus Sérès)
1948
Six days of Paris (with Achiel Bruneel)
Tour de France:
Winner stage 3
3rd place overall classification
1949
Tour de France:
Winner stage 8
1950
Six days of Saint-Etienne (with Achiel Bruneel)
1951
Six days of Hannover (with Emile Carrara)
Six days of Berlin (with Emile Carrara)
1952
Six days of Berlin (with Emile Carrara)

References

External links 

Official Tour de France results for Guy Lapébie

1916 births
2010 deaths
Sportspeople from Landes (department)
Cyclists at the 1936 Summer Olympics
French male cyclists
French Tour de France stage winners
Olympic cyclists of France
Olympic gold medalists for France
Olympic silver medalists for France
Olympic medalists in cycling
Tour de Suisse stage winners
Medalists at the 1936 Summer Olympics
French track cyclists
Cyclists from Nouvelle-Aquitaine